Elanthangudi is a village in India located  from the town of Mayiladuthurai District, heading in the direction of Thiruvarur. The village Falls under Arivazhuvur Panchayath. Elanthangudi village's district headquarters is Mayiladuthurai. It is  km from this village and this village about 300 km from State capital Chennai.

Elanthangudi Official Website  : http://elanthangudijamath.rf.gd

Elanthangudi Pin code :  609401

Scholars and educators

Scholars
Elanthangudi has many scholars in its history, Initially they used to produce an Islamic scholars from Madrasa, later they stopped Because of finances running out nowadays Gents Madarasa is not Functioning.

In 2013 Women madrasa was started in Elanthandgudi, by Alhaj.Tajudeen, Now its producing women's Islamic scholars in this area, The Madarasa is Located in Azad street

Educators
Elanthangudi's first Graduate is Late Alhaj Mr.K.M.Zakaria, he completed his B.com., Graduate in 1951. Later he completed his Diploma in Economies in Vietnam, while he working in US Army as a Warehouse Manager.

As per the survey result 2013 : 83.7% Of Youths Are graduated in Elanthangudi Village. its shows Elanthangudi has a wealthy future generation .

Schools and colleges

Schools
There are the Four Following Schools in Elanthangudi village

1. Government Higher Sec School

2. Government elementary School

3. Montecherri primary school (Private Sector)

4. ALAMAN elementary school (Private Sector)

Research Academy
Integrated Farm and Organic Research Academy is located near to Takwa Palli Masjid, this Academy stated by Mr.Alispak in 2017.

Research Academy website = http://www.ifora.net

Mr. Alispak Well known as a இயற்கை விவசாயி. and He Received an award from Lions Club For his contribution towards to Natural Farming ( இயற்கை விவசாயம்  )

Source Of income
Initially most peoples are used to do Agriculture, and doing own business in all over the Asian countries, after 1975 Many peoples prefer to earn money from GCC,

Still Agriculture having important part in Source Of Income in Elanthangudi Village,

and peoples having own Business all over the Tamil Nadu State, and in East Asian Countries.

People's Represent

Culture and religion

Elanthangudi is well known as a Muslim Belt village, but people of other religions can also be found east and west of the village. There are four temples and four mosques in Elanthangudi.

Important (Markable) Places In Elanthangudi Village

Photo gallery

References

Villages in Mayiladuthurai district